Amitis or Amytis may refer to:

 Amytis of Babylon ( 630–565 BCE), daughter of Cyaxares and wife of Nebuchadnezzar
 Amytis of Media (6th century BCE), daughter of Astyages and wife of Cyrus II
 Amytis of Persia (5th century BCE), daughter of Xerxes I
 Amytis Towfighi, American neurologist and professor
 5560 Amytis, a minor planet